North American football may refer to:

 CONCACAF, the association football governing body in North America, Central America, and the Caribbean
 North American Football Union, a regional grouping under CONCACAF of national football organizations in the North American Zone
 North American Football Confederation, the former association football governing body in North America
 Gridiron football, a football sport played primarily in Canada and the United States
 North American Football League, a defunct proposed American spring football league
 North American Soccer Football League, a former soccer league

See also
 American football
 American football (disambiguation)
 Association football in America (disambiguation)
 Canadian football
 International Federation of American Football
 List of leagues of American and Canadian football
 North American Indoor Football League (disambiguation)